The 1913–14 Austrian First Class season was the third season of top-tier football in Austria. It was won by Wiener AF as they won by head-to-head results against second place SK Rapid Wien

League standings

Results

References
Austria - List of final tables (RSSSF)

Austrian Football Bundesliga seasons
Austria
1913–14 in Austrian football